The Railways and Transport Safety Act 2003 (c 10) is an Act of the Parliament of the United Kingdom.

Purposes of the Act
The purposes of the Act include:-
the creation of the Rail Accident Investigation Branch
the replacement of the Rail Regulator by a Regulatory Board, the Office of Rail Regulation.
the creation of a police authority for the British Transport Police (BTP)
allowing the BTP to recruit police community support officers (PCSO) under the Police Reform Act 2002 which previously only extended to territorial police forces
giving the BTP "statutory authority over the railway"
the introduction of alcohol limits on the crews of water-borne vessels and aircraft in line with those already existing for railway staff
other miscellaneous matters affecting railway, air and road transport

Extent
The Act extends to the whole United Kingdom but with exceptions for Scotland, Wales and Northern Ireland

Repeals and amendments
Schedule 8 makes a number of amendments to other Acts but does not repeal any Acts entirely.

See also
Railways Act

References

External links
The Railways and Transport Safety Act 2003, as amended from the National Archives.
The Railways and Transport Safety Act 2003, as originally enacted from the National Archives.
Explanatory notes to the Railways and Transport Safety Act 2003.

United Kingdom Acts of Parliament 2003
Railway Acts
2003 in transport